The Portland Breakers were an American football team that played in the United States Football League (USFL) in the mid-1980s.  Before moving to Portland, Oregon, the franchise was previously in Boston, Massachusetts as the Boston Breakers and New Orleans, Louisiana as the New Orleans Breakers.

A new United States Football League – legally distinct from its predecessor, but using its team nicknames – was started in April 2022. A new version of the New Orleans Breakers is one of eight teams competing.

History

Boston Breakers

The team started out in 1983 as the Boston Breakers, owned by Boston businessman George Matthews and former New England Patriots wide receiver Randy Vataha. However, finding a stadium proved difficult. The lack of a professional-quality stadium had stymied previous attempts at pro football in Boston before the Patriots arrived in 1960.

The largest stadium in the region was Schaefer Stadium in Foxborough, home of the Patriots. However, it was owned by the Sullivan family, owners of the Patriots, and Matthews and Vataha were not willing to have an NFL team as their landlord. As a result, their initial choice for a home facility was Harvard Stadium, but Harvard University rejected them almost out of hand. They finally settled on Nickerson Field on the campus of Boston University, which seated only 21,000 people – the smallest stadium in the league.  The team's cheerleaders were called "Heartbreakers".

Coach Dick Coury put together a fairly competitive team led by quarterback Johnnie Walton (then 36 years old, a former Continental Football League and World Football League alumnus who had been out of football since the late 1970s) and Canadian Football League veteran halfback Richard Crump. The Breakers finished 11-7, finishing one game behind the Chicago Blitz for the final playoff spot. Walton, who had retired from pro football years earlier and had spent the previous three years coaching college football, was the league's seventh ranked passer. Coury was named coach of the year.

Despite fielding a fairly solid team, playing in Nickerson Field doomed the team in Boston. The stadium had been built in 1955 (though parts of it dated to 1915), and had not aged well. It was so small that the Breakers lost money even when they sold out as visiting teams got a portion of the gate proceeds.  The Breakers and Washington Federals were the only teams to draw fewer than 14,000 per game in 1983. The other 10 teams drew over 18,000 per game. (The fans who came to the games were generally passionate; the documentary Small Potatoes: Who Killed the USFL? made note of a particular Breakers victory in which fans stormed the field afterward.)  

Concluding that Nickerson Field was not suitable even for temporary use, Matthews again approached Harvard, but the school refused again. He then hashed out a deal to move to Foxborough, but ultimately decided against being a tenant of an NFL team. He considered an offer to sell a stake in the team to Jacksonville, Florida businessman Fred Bullard, but pulled out after Bullard proposed firing Coury in favor of Florida State coach Bobby Bowden. (Bullard would ultimately land an expansion franchise, the Jacksonville Bulls.) After floating offers to move to Seattle, Honolulu, and Portland, Matthews decided to move to New Orleans. He sold a 31 percent interest to New Orleans real estate developer Joe Canizaro, and the move was approved by the USFL on October 18, 1983. Matthews later sold his remaining stake to Canizaro, but Vataha remained as team president.

1983 Boston Breakers schedule

Sources

New Orleans Breakers

In New Orleans, the team played in the Louisiana Superdome, also home to the NFL's New Orleans Saints. They started out the season 5-0, and all signs pointed to them running away with the Southern Division. However, they only won three more games to finish 8-10. This included a 35-0 thrashing by the Philadelphia Stars and losses in their last six games, a skid fittingly capped off with an embarrassment by the Washington Federals in the season finale. In spite of adding NFL star tight end Dan Ross and rookie halfbacks Buford Jordan and Marcus Dupree (whose signing was technically against USFL rules as he was underage), the team struggled. Walton was inconsistent and ultimately retired after the season, while Dupree would experience constant problems with his knees throughout his time with the Breakers.

Years later, defensive lineman Jeff Gaylord recalled that the Breakers' slide came because many of his teammates were sucked into New Orleans' drug culture. According to Gaylord, cocaine use ran rampant in the locker room, and its lure was too strong for many of his teammates who had grown up poor.

On the positive side, New Orleans supported the team well, averaging 30,557 per game. Many of them came to see Dupree, who grew up in neighboring Mississippi. Jordan ran for 1,276 yards (fourth in the league), and Ross and wide receiver Frank Lockett had strong years.

After the season, league owners decided to go for broke and move to a fall schedule starting in 1986. This put teams like New Orleans, Michigan, and Philadelphia in an awkward situation. Canizaro believed he could not hope to compete directly with the Saints, even though the Breakers were one of the few USFL teams that could have potentially run their NFL rivals out of town. At the time, the Saints were mired in decades-long mediocrity, having only managed to get to .500 twice in their history. Then-owner John W. Mecom Jr. was looking to sell or move the team. However, rather than play a lame-duck spring 1985 season in New Orleans, Canizaro opted to move the team for the second time in as many years.

Tommy Lister Jr. attempted to cross over into football after a successful track and field career at California State University, Los Angeles; he played the 1984 preseason with the team but failed to make the regular season roster. Lister then returned to Los Angeles, where he pursued an acting and professional wrestling career.

1984 New Orleans Breakers schedule

Sources

Portland Breakers

Searching for a home, Canizaro considered moving to Sacramento and Columbus, and even weighed merging with the Birmingham Stallions. However, he was particularly intrigued when he visited Portland.  It was a fairly large market with a reasonably adequate facility by USFL standards, Civic Stadium (which seated 32,000 people at the time). The move to Portland was announced on  It marked a return home of sorts for Coury, who had led the World Football League's Portland Storm in 1974. Initially, Portland seemed to welcome the Breakers with open arms. The Breakers sold 6,000 of its highest-priced tickets within twelve hours.

On the field the team struggled, as the strain of playing in three cities in three years finally caught up with them. The team opted to go with former Jacksonville starter Matt Robinson as Walton's replacement, rather than seeking a more proven USFL quarterback without a home, like Craig Penrose, Alan Risher, or Mike Hohensee, or trading for someone like Oakland's Fred Besana, or even signing an NFL veteran. Robinson ultimately proved to be a less-than-adequate replacement for Walton, finishing with a 62.6 QB rating.  Halfback Jordan had another strong year with over 800 yards gained, as did Lockett. However, their season effectively ended when Dupree suffered a season-ending knee injury in the season opener. While they managed to upend four playoff teams, they never recovered from a six-game losing streak and finished 6-12.

The Breakers were one of nine teams slated to play in the USFL's first fall season, and were slated to be one of only two teams west of the Mississippi River.  However, they had only drawn 19,919 per game, not enough to break even. This was partly because Civic Stadium was in an area of downtown with little parking (a stop on the MAX Light Rail line would not open for another decade). With such meager attendance, meeting payroll became an adventure. At one point midway through the season, the players were only paid every other week. With four games to go, the checks stopped coming altogether. They were forced to waive their entire roster after missing their final payroll. Coury later recalled that he and his staff never got paid the full salaries stipulated in their contracts.

After talks to merge with other teams failed, Canizaro folded the franchise while the USFL's antitrust suit against the NFL was underway, citing over $17 million in losses over three years. It had been obvious even before Canizaro folded the franchise that the Breakers would never play another down.

Canizaro was the only league owner who moved his team twice and both moves were long distance. There was some discussion of transplanting the Denver Gold organization to Portland, but this idea was abandoned as the Gold (whose owners opposed moving to the fall) instead merged with the Jacksonville Bulls. The entire league suspended operations not long after, when it was awarded only three dollars in damages.

The Breakers had the distinction of being the only team to play for the entire duration of the USFL for three cities, each season in a different city without relocating mid-season. Unlike many USFL teams, the Breakers never changed its name, logo, or colors when it relocated.

1985 Portland Breakers schedule

Sources

Top "name" players
Among the top "name" Breakers players were: linebacker Marcus Marek; halfbacks Marcus Dupree and Buford Jordan; quarterbacks Johnnie Walton and Matt Robinson; kicker Tim Mazzetti; punter Jeff Gossett; offensive tackle Broderick Thompson; and tight end Dan Ross.

Coaches and executives
Coury was the team's coach for all three seasons. He was no stranger to Portland, having coached the Storm of the World Football League in 1974. Defensive coordinator was the late Pokey Allen who would later take Portland State University to two national championship games. Division I journeyman Bob Shaw who was hired after leaving Lou Holtz's staff at the University of Arkansas and served in both New Orleans and Portland.  The offensive coordinator during the 1983 season was College Football Hall of Fame and former NFL Most Valuable Player Roman Gabriel. After the 1984 season, Jim Fassel was hired as offensive coordinator, but after five months on the job, he left to become head coach at the University of Utah. In 1985, the offensive coordinator was Pete Kettela, a former head coach of the Edmonton Eskimos. Allen would hire former Breaker executive Steven "Dream" Weaver as his marketing director and whose publicity stunts raised his Portland State teams to national acclaim. The team president for the Portland Breakers was John Ralston, who was also a founder of the USFL. Other executives included Jack Galmiche, John Brunelle, and Brian Feldman. Feldman was the only executive who worked in all three cities.

Single-season leaders
Rushing Yards: 1,296 (1984), Buford Jordan
Receiving Yards: 1,189 (1984), Frank Lockett
Passing Yards: 3,772 (1983), Johnnie Walton

Season-by-season 

|-
| colspan="6" style="background:#0088CE; color:#FFFFFF; text-align:center;"| Boston Breakers
|-
|1983 || 11 || 7 || 0 || 2nd Atlantic || --
|-
| colspan="6" style="background:#0088CE; color:#FFFFFF; text-align:center;"| New Orleans Breakers
|-
|1984 || 8 || 10 || 0 || 3rd EC Southern || --
|-
| colspan="6" style="background:#0088CE; color:#FFFFFF; text-align:center;"| Portland Breakers
|-
|1985 || 6 || 12 || 0 || 5th WC || --
|-
!Totals || 25 || 29 || 0
|colspan="2"|

Head coaches 
Dick Coury (1983–1985)

References

External links
 Remember the USFL – Breakers History

 
1985 establishments in Oregon
1985 disestablishments in Oregon